Gordonia is a genus of gram-positive, aerobic, catalase-positive bacterium in the Actinomycetota, closely related to the Rhodococcus, Mycobacterium, and Nocardia genera. It is from the same lineage that includes Mycobacterium tuberculosis.
The genus was discovered by Tsukamura in 1971 and named after American bacteriologist Ruth Gordon.. Many species are often found in the soil and are rarely known to cause infections in humans. Some investigations have found that 28 °C is the ideal temperature for the growth of Gordonia bacteria. Some species of Gordonia, such as Gordonia rubripertincta, produce colonies that have a bright orange or orange-red color.

Some strains of Gordonia have recently garnered interest in the biotechnology industry due to their ability to degrade environmental pollutants.

Species
Gordonia comprises the following species:

 G. aichiensis corrig. (Tsukamura 1983) Klatte et al. 1994
 G. alkaliphila Cha and Cha 2013
 G. alkanivorans Kummer et al. 1999
 G. amarae corrig. (Lechevalier and Lechevalier 1974) Klatte et al. 1994
 G. amicalis Kim et al. 2000
 G. araii Kageyama et al. 2006
 G. asplenii Suriyachadkun et al. 2021
 "G. australis" Schneider et al. 2008
 G. bronchialis corrig. (Tsukamura 1971) Stackebrandt et al. 1989
 G. caeni Srinivasan et al. 2012
 G. cholesterolivorans Drzyzga et al. 2009
 G. crocea Tamura et al. 2020
 G. defluvii Soddell et al. 2006
 G. desulfuricans Kim et al. 1999
 G. didemni de Menezes et al. 2016
 G. effusa Kageyama et al. 2006
 G. hankookensis Park et al. 2009
 G. hirsuta corrig. Klatte et al. 1996
 G. hongkongensis Tsang et al. 2016
 G. humi Kämpfer et al. 2011
 G. hydrophobica corrig. Bendinger et al. 1995
 G. insulae Kim et al. 2020
 G. iterans Kang et al. 2014
 "G. jacobaea" De Miguel et al. 2000
 G. jinghuaiqii Zhang et al. 2021
 G. jinhuaensis Li et al. 2014

 G. lacunae Le Roes et al. 2009
 G. malaquae Yassin et al. 2007
 G. mangrovi Xie et al. 2020
 G. namibiensis Brandão et al. 2002
 G. neofelifaecis Liu et al. 2011

 G. oryzae Muangham et al. 2019
 G. otitidis Iida et al. 2005
 G. paraffinivorans Xue et al. 2003
 G. phosphorivorans Kämpfer et al. 2013
 G. phthalatica Jin et al. 2017
 G. polyisoprenivorans Linos et al. 1999
 "G. pseudoamarae" Batinovic et al. 2021
 G. rhizosphera Takeuchi and Hatano 1998
 G. rubripertincta corrig. (Hefferan 1904) Stackebrandt et al. 1989

 G. sediminis Sangkanu et al. 2019
 G. shandongensis Luo et al. 2007
 G. sihwensis Kim et al. 2003
 G. sinesedis Maldonado et al. 2003
 G. soli Shen et al. 2006
 G. spumicola Tamura et al. 2020
 G. sputi corrig. (Tsukamura and Yano 1985) Stackebrandt et al. 1989
 G. terrae corrig. (Tsukamura 1971) Stackebrandt et al. 1989
 "G. terrea" Stobdan et al. 2008
 G. westfalica Linos et al. 2002
 G. zhaorongruii Zhang et al. 2021

See also
Unicellular organism
Gram-positive bacteria
Gordonia sp. nov. Q8

References

External links
Gordonia at BacDive -  the Bacterial Diversity Metadatabase

Mycobacteriales
Bacteria genera